Lester Charlesworth (11 October 1916 – 15 January 1980) was an Australian cricketer. He played eight first-class matches for Western Australia between 1949/50 and 1950/51.

See also
 List of Western Australia first-class cricketers

References

External links
 

1916 births
1980 deaths
Australian cricketers
Western Australia cricketers
Australian Army personnel of World War II
Australian Army officers